Sir Hugh Norwood Robson  (18 October 1917 – 11 December 1977) was a Scottish physician noted as a university administrator in several countries, including Vice-Chancellor of the University of Sheffield from 1966 to 1974 and Principal of the University of Edinburgh from 1974 to 1977. The Hugh Robson Building in George Square (part of the University of Edinburgh) is named after him, as is the Hugh Robson Computer Laboratory.

Life

Known as Norrie, Robson was born in 1917 in Langholm, Dumfriesshire, the son of Elizabeth Warnock, a farmer's daughter, and Hugh Robson, a civil servant in the Inland Revenue. He was educated at Langholm Academy then Dumfries Academy.

He studied medicine at the University of Edinburgh graduating with an MB ChB in 1941. He then, as his service during the Second World War, joined the Royal Navy Volunteer Reserve and served in Singapore as a Lieutenant Surgeon.

Returning to the University of Edinburgh as a lecturer in 1947 after serving as a surgeon lieutenant in the RNVR during the Second World War. He then became a senior lecturer at the University of Aberdeen, then a professor of medicine at the University of Adelaide. In 1966 he returned to the UK and took up the post of Vice-Chancellor of the University of Sheffield.

In 1974 he was knighted by Queen Elizabeth II and returned to the University of Edinburgh as Principal and Vice-Chancellor. In 1975 he received an honorary LLD from the University of Sheffield and a second honorary doctorate (DSc) from the University of Pennsylvania. In the same year he was elected a Fellow of the Royal Society of Edinburgh. His proposers were Anthony Elliot Ritchie, John Cameron, Lord Cameron, Neil Campbell, Lord Balerno and Hugh Ernest Butler.

He died in Edinburgh on 11 December 1977.

Family

He married Alice Livingstone in 1942 just prior to going on active service. They had one son and two daughters.

Hugh Robson Building

Hugh Robson has a lasting memorial in place in George Square, Edinburgh, where the University of Edinburgh named a building on their campus after him.

The building was built in 1978 as part of the general redevelopment of the Square which had been acquired by the university in the 1960s.

It houses a 24-hour computer lab for students.

References 

Principals of the University of Edinburgh
Alumni of the University of Edinburgh
Academics of the University of Sheffield
Knights Bachelor
1917 births
1977 deaths
Royal Naval Volunteer Reserve personnel of World War II
People from Langholm
Vice-Chancellors of the University of Sheffield